In mathematics, 6-sphere coordinates are a coordinate system for three-dimensional space obtained by inverting the 3D Cartesian coordinates across the unit 2-sphere .  They are so named because the loci where one coordinate is constant form spheres tangent to the origin from one of six sides (depending on which coordinate is held constant and whether its value is positive or negative). They have nothing whatsoever to do with the 6-sphere, which is an object of considerable interest in its own right.

The three coordinates are

Since inversion is its own inverse, the equations for x, y, and z in terms of u, v, and w are similar:
  
This coordinate system is -separable for the 3-variable Laplace equation.

See also 
Multiplicative inverse (for 1-dimensional version)
Y-Δ transform (unrelated, but similar formula for comparison)
6-sphere

References 
 Moon, P. and Spencer, D. E. 6-sphere Coordinates. Fig. 4.07 in Field Theory Handbook, Including Coordinate Systems, Differential Equations, and Their Solutions, 2nd ed. New York: Springer-Verlag, pp. 122–123, 1988.
 
 Six-Sphere Coordinates by Michael Schreiber, the Wolfram Demonstrations Project.

Three-dimensional coordinate systems
Inversive geometry
Orthogonal coordinate systems